Habronattus jucundus is a species of spider in the family Salticidae, found in the U.S. and Canada.

The species are black coloured.

References

Salticidae
Spiders of North America
Spiders described in 1909